The Disney Afternoon Collection is a compilation video game developed by Digital Eclipse and published by Capcom. It features six video games originally developed by Capcom and released for the Nintendo Entertainment System, all based on animated series from the television block The Disney Afternoon, which ran in syndication from 1990 to 1997. The compilation includes the titles DuckTales, Chip 'n Dale Rescue Rangers, TaleSpin, Darkwing Duck, DuckTales 2, and Chip 'n Dale Rescue Rangers 2. It was released on April 18, 2017, for PlayStation 4, Windows, and Xbox One.

Gameplay

All six games in the collection are primarily side-scrolling platform games. The games retain their original style and gameplay, but the compilation also includes the ability to rewind game time to correct mistakes, and time attack and boss rush modes, in which players are able to compete in online leaderboards. Additionally, the compilation includes concept art, music, and additional assets created for the original games.

Development
The ports to modern systems were developed by Digital Eclipse. According to John Faciane, associate producer for the collection, the idea of compiling the various Capcom games developed in association with The Disney Afternoon show block was already in place when he joined Capcom in July 2016. He said that there was growing fan interest in these games after Digital Eclipse released the Mega Man Legacy Collection in August 2015, and when he had joined, the company was in the final stages of figuring out which games to include in the collection. The ports are based on the studio's Eclipse Engine, also used in the Mega Man Legacy Collection, which is able to take the original ROM images and decompile them so that they can then re-execute the code in a virtual machine developed for modern systems. The studio recognized, like many games of the 8-bit era, that these titles were generally difficult compared to more contemporary games, and incorporated features like save states and the rewind feature to help players. Some of the additional content for the game were from archives that Digital Eclipse's head of restoration Frank Cifaldi had made when he "pirated" the games as a youth.

Reception

The Disney Afternoon Collection received mostly positive reviews on upon release, earning average scores of 78 out of 100 for the PC version, 76 out of 100 for the PlayStation 4 version, and 75 out of 100 for the Xbox One version from Metacritic.

Many reviewers commented on the appeal of the games being potentially limited to players familiar with games from the 8-bit era. In his review for GameSpot, Jason D'Aprile called the collection "a refined time capsule that covers a very specific chapter in gaming history", and that the appeal was the entire package rather than any specific game, elaborating that "while these games might not be anything to get overly excited about individually, in a package that includes plenty of history and extras, this collection is a nostalgic curiosity with heart". Samuel Claiborn of IGN called the compilation "a collection aimed squarely at fans of old-fashioned platformers that makes little effort to update them for modern conventions", and that the quality of each game varied, calling them "three hits and three duds". The website would additionally praise the title's extra features and art gallery. Ray Carsillo of EGM called the title "pure nostalgia", but that it could be recommended to newer Disney fans "as long as they can appreciate the 8-bit "vintage" look". However, the publication remarked that the game's rewind feature could sometimes cause crashes or slowdown.

References

2017 video games
Capcom video game compilations
Digital Eclipse games
The Disney Afternoon
Disney games by Capcom
Disney video games
Multiplayer and single-player video games
PlayStation 4 games
Video games developed in the United States
Windows games
Xbox One games